Dianmeisaurus is an extinct genus of pachypleurosaur from the Middle Triassic Guanling Formation in China. The type species is D. gracilis.

References 

Pachypleurosaurs